Callidrepana argenteola is a moth in the family Drepanidae first described by Frederic Moore in 1860. It is found from the Oriental tropics to Taiwan, the Philippines, Sulawesi and Timor. The habitat consists of lowland forests.

The wingspan is about 54 mm. The wings are pale ochreous brown with a narrow discal brown streak on the forewings with parallel fainter antemedial and postmedial bars flanking it. The veins posterior to the bars are slightly paler. The postmedial lines are double. The forewings are falcate (sickle shaped) in both sexes.

The larvae feed on Mangifera species. They can be found on the upperside of the leaves of their host plant, stretched along the midrib. The larvae resemble bird droppings and are greenish black, streaked with grey. Pupation takes place in a cradle at the edge of a leaf, pulled together with silk.

Subspecies
Callidrepana argenteola argenteola
Callidrepana argenteola celebensis Warren, 1922 (Sulawesi)
Callidrepana argenteola dialitha West, 1932 (Philippines)

References

Moths described in 1860
Drepaninae